Thad McIntosh Guyer (born January 29, 1950) is an American civil rights lawyer with an international practice based in the State of Oregon.

Education
After graduating in 1969 from North Miami Senior High School in Miami, Florida, Guyer was conscripted through the military draft and fought in the U.S. Army during the Vietnam war, earning the rank of Sergeant, and receiving the Bronze Star for meritorious service after his one-year tour. He was honorably discharged in 1970 and attended the Georgetown University Edmund A. Walsh School of Foreign Service, graduating in 1975 with a BS in International Law and Politics, and then the Antioch School of Law, graduating in 1978.

Legal career
Guyer was involved with Legal Services Corporation dating back to 1978 in Tennessee, Arkansas, and Oregon. Since February 1990, Guyer has worked with T.M. Guyer & Friends, PC., which in 2005 became T.M. Guyer and Ayers & Friends, PC. Guyer partnered with attourney Stephani L. Ayers to form Guyer & Ayers, a private law firm with a focus on corporate accountability, The Sarbanes-Oxley Act and whistleblower representation in cyber security, nuclear safety, petrochemical and pipeline safety, aviation safety,  food and pharmaceutical safety industries.

National Whistleblower Advocacy and Litigation
Guyer has been an active litigator before the United States Merit Systems Protection Board representing federal employees who have been retaliated against for reporting fraud, abuse of authority, waste and environmental abuses by federal agencies. Guyer is known for challenging of the wrongful termination of Shawn Carpenter by Sandia National Laboratories. Guyer and his law partner Stephani L. Ayers co-counseled the case with American civil liberties lawyer Philip B. Davis

Guyer was also  involved with Government Accountability Project (GAP) for over two decades. From 2002 until 2005, he served as GAP's Litigation Director and General Counsel. From 1986 to 2002 he worked as adjunct private attorney at GAP, representing GAP whistleblowers nationwide and internationally.  He has associated on numerous cases Thomas M. Devine, a contributor on the federal Whistleblower Protection Act.

International Advocacy
In 1980, Guyer provided emergency representation to the Cuban refugees involved in the Mariel Boatlift who were being detained by the INS at the former Atlanta Federal Penitentiary. In 1996, he served with the American Bar Association supported Coalition for International Justice researching prisoners' rights under international law at the International Criminal Tribunal for the Former Yugoslavia in The Hague, Netherlands. In 2006, he served as an advocate for whistleblowers in Tunis, Tunisia who were challenging lending practices involving international aid being administered by the African Development Bank.

Legal education
Guyer has given lectures at the Drexel University School of Law, The Wharton School of the University of Pennsylvania, Central University of Finance and Economics, Anhui Agricultural University, and at the National Employment Lawyers Association and the Practicing Law Institute, New York. He has presented webinars for the Accountability Project and the American Association for Justice,

Publications
Thad M. Guyer and Stephani L. Ayers, "The Dimensions of Sarbanes-Oxley Federal Question Jurisdiction", Practicing Law Institute, 718 PLI/Lit 331 (January 2005). 
Thad M. Guyer,   Oregon Bar Bulletin, "Email and Horror: The critical need for e-mail redundancy" July 2002.
Thad M. Guyer, "Behind the Technology Curve: Affordable Solutions for Lawyers without Lots of Money", Washington State Bar News, February 2003.

Robert S. Catz & Thad M. Guyer, "Federal in Forma Pauperis Litigation: In Search of Judicial Standards", 31 Rutgers Law Review 655 (1979), cited in Case, J., 90 KYLJ 701 Kentucky Law Journal, "Pro Se Litigants at the Summary Judgment Stage".
Thad M. Guyer, Survey of Local Civil Discovery Procedures, (Fed. Judicial Center 1977), cited in Edward F. Sherman, Tulane Journal of International and Comparative Law, "The Evolution of American Civil Trial Process: Towards Greater Congruence with Continental Practice", Spring 1999; and "Report to the President and the Attorney General", 80 F.R.D. 509 January 22, 1979. 
Thad M. Guyer and Debra F. Lee, "The Ethics of Poor Law Firm Management in the Legal Services System", 13 Clearinghouse Rev. 484 (1979), cited in "Conceiving a Lawyer's Duty to the Poor", 19 Hofstra Law Review 885 Summer, 1991

References

External links 
T.M. Guyer and Ayers & Friends, PC

1950 births
Living people
Lawyers from Los Angeles
Walsh School of Foreign Service alumni
David A. Clarke School of Law alumni
United States Army soldiers